Stanley Raymond "Bucky" Harris (November 8, 1896 – November 8, 1977) was an American professional baseball second baseman, manager and executive. While Harris played in Major League Baseball (MLB) for the Washington Senators and Detroit Tigers, it was his long managerial career that led to his enshrinement in the Baseball Hall of Fame, elected as a manager by the Veterans Committee, in 1975. Hired by the Senators to act as player-manager at the age of 27, Harris would lead the team to the 1924 World Series title, becoming the youngest manager to win a championship and the first rookie manager to do so (four other rookies have accomplished the feat since). Harris managed 29 seasons, fourth most in MLB history. In his tenure as manager for five teams (with two tenures each for Washington and Detroit), Harris won over 2,150 games, three league pennants and two World Series championships, with the gap between appearances/championships in the World Series being the longest in major league history.

Early life
Of Swiss and Welsh descent, Harris was born in Port Jervis, New York, and raised after the age of six in Pittston, Pennsylvania. His father, Thomas, had emigrated from Wales, while his mother, Catherine (Rupp), hailed from Hughestown, near Pittston. His elder brother, Merle, was a minor league second baseman. Bucky Harris left school at age 13 to work at a local colliery, the Butler Mine, as an office boy and, later, a weigh master. In his spare time, Harris played basketball for the Pittston YMCA team as well as sandlot baseball.

Playing and player-manager career
In 1916, when Harris was 19, Pittston native Hughie Jennings, then the manager of the Detroit Tigers, signed him  to his first contract and farmed him to the Class B Muskegon Reds of the Central League, where he struggled as a batsman and was released. Harris then caught on with the Scranton Miners, Norfolk Tars and Reading Pretzels through 1917, before reaching the highest level of minor league baseball with the 1918–1919 Buffalo Bisons of the International League. Harris improved his batting skills during the latter season with the Bisons, making 126 hits and raising his average to .282.

He then was recommended to the Washington Senators by baseball promoter Joe Engel, who led the Chattanooga Lookouts at Engel Stadium. In August 1919, at the age of 22, he came up to Washington but was unimpressive at first, batting a meager .214 and getting into only eight games that first season. Despite this poor showing, owner-manager Clark Griffith made him Washington's regular second baseman in 1920, and before long Harris was batting .300 and making a mark for himself as a tough competitor, standing up to even ferocious superstar Ty Cobb, who threatened Harris when he tagged Cobb in their first encounter.

Harris spent most of his playing career as a second baseman with the Senators (1919–1928). In 1924, he was named player-manager; at the age of 27 he was the youngest manager in the Majors.  He proceeded to lead the Senators to their only World Series title in Washington in his rookie season, and was nicknamed "The Boy Wonder." He won a second consecutive American League pennant in 1925, but the Senators lost the  1925 World Series in Pittsburgh in the late innings of Game 7 after leading 3–1 in the Series. Baseball historian William C. Kashatus wrote of his dominant play in the 1924 World Series:  "Not only did he set records for chances accepted, double plays and put-outs in the exciting seven-game affair, but he batted .333 and hit two home runs" — including an important roundtripper in Game 7 which opened the scoring and gave Washington a 1–0 lead in the 4th inning. These feats are even more impressive considering that the light-hitting Harris only hit nine home runs during his entire career.

Managing career after 1925
Harris’ initial departure from the Senators in 1928 (he would twice return to manage them again from 1935–1942 and 1950–1954) came in a trade to the Tigers as player-manager.  Although he retired as a player after the 1931 season, his playing career effectively ended with his trade to Detroit. Harris only made 11 cameo appearances in the Tiger lineup: seven in 1929 and four in 1931. In all, he appeared in 1,263 games over all or portions of 13 seasons, and collected 1,297 hits, with 224 doubles, 64 triples, nine home runs, 472 bases on balls, and 167 stolen bases. Harris batted .274 lifetime with 508 career runs batted in.

In addition to Harris‘ three separate terms as field leader of the Senators, he also managed the Tigers twice (1929–1933, 1955–1956), Boston Red Sox (1934), Philadelphia Phillies (1943) and New York Yankees (1947–1948).

Senators, Tigers, Red Sox and Phillies (1926–1943)

After Harris‘ back-to-back pennants in 1924–1925, he was able to keep the Senators in the first division for the next three seasons, but their win totals declined, from 96 (1925) to 81, then 85. The  Tigers had won only 68 games, and Harris'  edition offered only a slight improvement, winning 70. In five full seasons as the Tigers' manager, he produced only one winning year, when Detroit went 76–75 and finished fifth and  games behind the Yankees. His eventual successor, Mickey Cochrane, a future Hall-of-Fame catcher who was acquired from the Philadelphia Athletics, would lead the Tigers as a player-manager to back-to-back pennants in 1934–1935 (and their first-ever world championship in the latter year).

Boston was then a habitual tail-ender in the American League, and had registered 15 consecutive losing seasons since its  world championship. The 1933 Red Sox had won only 63 games and finished seventh in the eight-team AL under Marty McManus, but their wealthy new owner, Tom Yawkey, had begun a major rebuilding of both the ball club and Fenway Park. Yawkey jettisoned McManus and personally selected Harris as his new manager, and his 1934 Red Sox, despite an injury-riddled season by newly purchased ace left-handed pitcher Lefty Grove, broke the losing-season streak, finishing at .500 (76–76). But Harris's stay in the Boston dugout lasted only one season. He and Eddie Collins, the Red Sox' general manager, had feuded since their playing days and Yawkey may have hired Harris without consulting Collins. Harris then took Cronin's old job, returning to Clark Griffith and the Senators.

Harris' second term in Washington lasted for eight seasons (1935–1942), his longest tenure as a skipper. However, he never approached the highs of 1924 or 1925. Only one of his teams, the 1936 Senators, had a winning record (82–71) and first-division finish. Harris kept the club out of the American League basement, but three consecutive seventh-place finishes from 1940–1942 led to his departure and his only season in the National League as skipper of the 1943 Phillies.

Perhaps the worst team (42–109, .278) in baseball in 1942, the Phillies had just been sold to lumberman William D. Cox. Under Harris, the 1943 edition improved to play .424 baseball (39–53), with just three fewer victories than they had in all of 1942. However, Harris chafed at Cox' constant interference. When Harris protested, Cox abruptly fired him on July 27. 

Harris then played a role in Cox' banishment from professional baseball for betting on games. On the day after his firing, Harris dropped a bombshell at his hotel room — he had evidence that Cox was betting on baseball. Harris's friends, outraged at his firing, informed Commissioner of Baseball Kenesaw Mountain Landis that Cox was violating baseball's anti-gambling mandate.  Landis then summoned Harris to his office to testify in person about Cox' behavior. The owner was suspended indefinitely three months later and banned from baseball outright soon afterward. The Phillies were sold to R. R. M. Carpenter in November 1943.

Yankees (1947–1948)
Harris then spent three seasons out of the big leagues, serving as general manager (1944–1946) and field manager (1944–1945) of the Buffalo Bisons, his old team in the International League. In August 1946, the Yankees' co-owner and GM, Larry MacPhail, appointed Harris to a front-office position.

The tumultuous  season saw MacPhail employ three managers — Joe McCarthy, Bill Dickey, and Johnny Neun — and finish third, 17 games in arrears of the pennant-winning Red Sox. At the close of the season, MacPhail named Harris the Bombers' 1947 manager, and he led them to his third American League pennant — the Yankees' 15th league title.

Behind Most Valuable Player Joe DiMaggio and newly acquired starting pitcher Allie Reynolds, the 1947 Yanks won 97 games and prevailed over the Tigers by a 12-game margin. Then they won Harris's second World Series championship, defeating the Jackie Robinson-led Brooklyn Dodgers in a thrilling, seven-game Fall Classic.

Although MacPhail sold his stake in the Yankees and left baseball immediately after the 1947 Series, Harris returned for a second season as manager. His 1948 Yankees won 94 games to finish a close third in a hectic pennant race, two games behind the Cleveland Indians and Red Sox, who ended the regular season in a tie for first place. But the result dissatisfied the Yankees' post-MacPhail ownership team, Dan Topping and Del Webb, and their new general manager, George Weiss, and they replaced Harris with Casey Stengel.  Stengel would lead New York to ten American League pennants and seven World Series titles in the next 12 seasons.

Final terms with Senators and Tigers (1950–1956)
Harris returned to the minor leagues in 1949, as manager of the San Diego Padres of the Pacific Coast League, before launching his third stint as skipper of the Senators, coming off a 104-loss 1949 season.

The 1955 Tigers won 79 games (eleven more than 's edition) and had their first above-.500 season since . Pitcher Ned Garver described Harris as "sympathetic," recalling that he would wait until an inning was over before replacing a pitcher on the mound. But the Tigers finished fifth each season, and were experiencing turmoil in their front office; outspoken owner Walter Briggs Jr. was harshly critical of Harris and his coaches during the season and was in the process of selling the team. Fired by new owner Fred Knorr, Harris closed out his 29-year MLB managing career with a win–loss record of 2,158–2,219 (.493). As of September 2019, Harris ranked seventh in MLB manager career wins.

Managerial record

Front office career
In 1957, at 60, Harris rejoined the Red Sox in a front office capacity. He was assistant general manager to Joe Cronin for two seasons, and then, when Cronin was named president of the American League, succeeded him as GM in January 1959, 24 years after Cronin had displaced Harris as Boston's field manager. Harris served for two losing seasons as general manager of the Red Sox before his firing in late September 1960. On his watch, the Red Sox finally broke the baseball color line by promoting Pumpsie Green from Triple-A on July 21, 1959, more than a dozen years after Robinson's debut with the Dodgers. They were the last of the 16 pre-expansion teams to integrate.

Rightfielder Jackie Jensen, still productive at age 33 — he had been 's American League MVP and the AL's 1959 runs batted in leader — sat out the entire 1960 campaign in retirement due to his fear of flying.

Harris made a flurry of minor trades in an attempt to shake up his faltering team. His two highest-profile transactions, which occurred during the 1959–1960 offseason, saw him send left-handed pitcher and former bonus baby Frank Baumann to the Chicago White Sox and veteran starting catcher Sammy White to the Indians. But Baumann led the AL in earned run average with the 1960 Chisox (while the player Harris obtained, first baseman Ron Jackson, struggled through only ten games with Boston before being traded away again) and White abruptly retired rather than report to Cleveland, canceling his trade. Harris also ran afoul of Yawkey when he fired Yawkey associate Pinky Higgins as manager and replaced him with Billy Jurges, a Senators' coach, on July 3, 1959, without consulting the owner. Jurges lasted less than a calendar year as the Red Sox' pilot before his firing in June 1960 — and replacement by Higgins. Harris's dismissal followed not quite four months later.

Harris ended his long MLB career as a scout for the White Sox (1961–1962) and special assistant for the new expansion Washington Senators franchise that played in D.C. from 1961 to 1971 before moving on to Arlington, Texas. All told, he spent over 55 years in baseball. He died in Bethesda, Maryland, on his 81st birthday.  According to his obituary in the November 10, 1977 Washington Post, Harris died after a long battle with Parkinson's disease. He was buried at St. Peter's Lutheran Church in Hughestown.

Personal life
Harris's father-in-law during his first marriage, which ended in divorce in 1951, was Howard Sutherland, former United States Senator from West Virginia.

See also

1924 World Series
1925 World Series
1947 World Series
List of Major League Baseball career stolen bases leaders
List of Major League Baseball player-managers
List of Major League Baseball managers by wins

References

Further reading
 Kashatus, William C. (2002). Diamonds in the Coalfields: 21 Remarkable Baseball Players, Managers, and Umpires from Northeast Pennsylvania. Jefferson, North Carolina: McFarland & Company. .

External links

Bucky Harris Biography at Baseball Biography
Bucky Harris at The Deadball Era

The Autograph Expert: Signature analysis and signing habits of Bucky Harris, at PSA Card

1896 births
1977 deaths
American people of Swiss descent
American people of Welsh descent
Baseball managers
Baseball players from New York (state)
Boston Red Sox executives
Boston Red Sox managers
Buffalo Bisons (minor league) managers
Buffalo Bisons (minor league) players
Chicago White Sox scouts
Detroit Tigers managers
Detroit Tigers players
Major League Baseball executives
Major League Baseball general managers
Major League Baseball player-managers
Major League Baseball second basemen
Minor league baseball executives
Muskegon Reds players
National Baseball Hall of Fame inductees
New York Yankees managers
Norfolk Tars players
People from Pittston, Pennsylvania
People from Port Jervis, New York
Philadelphia Phillies managers
Reading Pretzels players
Scranton Miners players
Washington Senators (1901–1960) managers
Washington Senators (1901–1960) players
Washington Senators (1961–1971) scouts
World Series-winning managers